Niederorschel is a municipality in the district of Eichsfeld in Thuringia, Germany. The former municipalities Deuna, Gerterode, Hausen and Kleinbartloff were merged into Niederorschel in January 2019. It further includes the localities of Niederorschel, Oberorschel, and Rüdigershagen.

References

Eichsfeld (district)